Frank Brennan is the name of:

Frank Brennan (judge) (1884–1949), Queensland Labor MLA and Supreme Court judge
Frank Brennan (politician) (1873–1950), Labor member of the Australian House of Representatives from 1911 to 1931 and 1934 to 1949
Frank Brennan (footballer) (1924–1997), Scottish footballer who played for Newcastle United
Frank Brennan (writer) (died 1995), Australian romance novelist under the name "Emma Darcy"
Frank Brennan (priest) (born 1954), Australian Jesuit priest, lawyer and academic
Frank Brennan (karateka) (born 1960), British karate champion and instructor
Frank Brennan (economist) (1947–2015), Irish economist

See also
Francis Brennan (disambiguation)